This is a list of all full-length (400 meter) indoor speed skating rinks in the world. The Richmond Olympic Oval and the Sport und Koncert Komplex (Winter Stadium) are the only venues to have been dismantled as a speed skating rink, in 2010 and 1992 respectively.  The first indoor artificial speed skating oval was the Sportforum Hohenschönhausen in East Berlin, Germany in 1985.  The first indoor artificial speed skating oval used in the Winter Olympics was the Olympic Oval in Calgary, Alberta, Canada in 1988.  Since the 1994 Winter Olympics in Lillehammer, Norway all speed skating competitions have been held in indoor ovals.

Current rinks

Closed/Reconfigured rinks

Notes

References

 
Lists of stadiums
Speed skating-related lists